Reichenow's batis (Batis reichenowi) is a passerine bird in the wattle-eye family, Platysteiridae occurring in southeast Tanzania in east Africa. It was formerly treated as a subspecies of the forest batis.

Taxonomy
Reichenow's batis was described by the German Ornithologist Hermann Grote in 1911 and given its current binomial name Batis reichenowi. The specific epithet was chosen to honour the German ornithologist Anton Reichenow. Reichenow's batis previously been treated as a subspecies of the forest batis (Batis mixta) and of the Cape batis (Batis capensis). Although the plumage of Reichenow's batis distinctive, an analysis of mitochondrial DNA sequences published in 2006 found that the DNA from specimens of Reichenow's batis were nested within sequences of the forest batis.

References

Reichenow's batis
Birds of East Africa
Reichenow's batis
Reichenow's batis